Reuben Rupert Jamieson, also known as Reuben Roper Jamieson, (December 12, 1856 – May 30, 1911) was the 16th mayor of Calgary, Alberta.

Jamieson was born in Westover, Ontario and educated in Hamilton, Ontario. His career between 1873 and 1902 was working for various railways. This included the Canadian Pacific Railway, which brought him to Calgary in 1903 as the area general superintendent.

In 1908, Jamieson retired from the CPR and entered civic politics. He served as Calgary's mayor from January 2, 1909 to January 2, 1911. During his tenure, the city completed the first phase of the Street Railway and he also served as the Vice President of the United Alberta Municipalities.

Along with his wife, Reuben Jamieson was a Christian Scientist, and a long-time member of First Church of Christ, Scientist, Calgary.

Jamieson died on May 30, 1911. It was reported this although his death was sudden, he had suffered a nervous breakdown. His wife, Alice Jamieson, was appointed in 1914 as the first female juvenile court judge in the British Empire and later became magistrate of the women's court. She was also active in the fight for women's suffrage.

References

External links 
 Mayor's gallery: City of Calgary (pdf)

1856 births
1911 deaths
Mayors of Calgary
Canadian Christian Scientists
20th-century Canadian politicians